The Pentateuch is the first part of the Bible, consisting of Genesis, Exodus, Leviticus, Numbers, and Deuteronomy.

Pentateuch may also refer to:
 Ashburnham Pentateuch, late 6th- or early 7th-century Latin illuminated manuscript of the Pentateuch
 Chumash, printed Torah, as opposed to a Torah scroll
 Samaritan Pentateuch,  a version of the Hebrew Pentateuch, written in the Samaritan alphabet and used by the Samaritans, for whom it is the entire biblical canon
 Targum Yerushalmi, a western targum (translation) of the Torah (Pentateuch) from the land of Israel (as opposed to the eastern Babylonian Targum Onkelos)

See also
 Torah (disambiguation)
 Chumash (disambiguation)
 Tanak (disambiguation)
 Hexateuch 
 Octateuch